Adventurer Kings is a closed-end, computer moderated, play-by-mail game. It was originally was published by Ark Royal Games. Today it published by Roland Danard.

The game is set in a medieval fantasy context with a map comprising 162 provinces. Players begin roleplaying as a king with a few resources to begin expansion by conquest. Characters are central to the game with various races, attributes, and alignments available. Magic and diplomacy are also part of the gameplay. Games last about 10–15 turns of one year each. Players with the greatest number of victory points win the game.

History and development
Adventurer Kings was initially published by Ark Royal Games. The game is computer moderated. It is close-ended. As of 2022, Roland Danard publishes the game.

Gameplay
Adventurer Kings is set in a medieval context. The game map comprises 162 provinces. Games have 8–12 players with "Super" games having 25–40 players. 

Players play the role of a minor king of a province with a few armies and some gold with the goal of expansion. Each annual turn allows players to conduct about a dozen and a half orders for characters and armies from spying, exploring, and recruiting or disbanding armies. Characters are central to the game and have various attributes and alignments. Player characters must be an Elf, Dwarf, Orc or Human while non-player character races of dragons and others are encountered in the game.

Magic plays a part in the game, with various magic items available and specific characters able to cast spells. Diplomacy is also part of gameplay, with all relationships beginning as neutral and players deciding how to progress as the game develops.

Games last 10–15 turns. The player with the greatest number of victory points at the game's conclusion is the winner. Games end if (1) a player—who becomes World Emperor—"controls 55% of the world tax base" or (2) more than two players control the same percentage and call for an election.

Reception
James Morgan reviewed the game in the July–August 1990 issue of Paper Mayhem, stating, "I recommend the game Adventurer Kings to all Fantasy game players." Adam Spatz provided a positive review in the March–April 1991 issue of Paper Mayhem, stating, "This is an excellent game with a great moderator and fast turnaround," while noting that others felt similarly, pointing to high ratings in Paper Mayhem.

See also
 List of play-by-mail games

References

Bibliography

 
 
 
 
 
 

Multiplayer games
Play-by-mail games